The Fathers of  Confederation are the 36 people who attended at least one of the Charlottetown Conference of 1864 (23 attendees), the Quebec Conference of 1864 (33 attendees), and the London Conference of 1866 (16 attendees), preceding Canadian Confederation.  Only eleven people attended all three conferences.

Table of participation
The following table lists the participants in the Charlottetown, Quebec, and London Conferences and their attendance at each stage.

Group photographs

Other possible claimants to title
Four other individuals have been labelled as Fathers of Confederation. Hewitt Bernard, who was the recording secretary at the Charlottetown Conference, is considered by some to be a Father of Confederation. The leaders most responsible for bringing three specific provinces into Confederation after 1867 are also referred to as Fathers of Confederation.
 The provisional government established by Louis Riel ultimately negotiated the terms under which Manitoba entered the Canadian Confederation in 1870.
 The leadership of Amor De Cosmos was instrumental both in bringing democracy to British Columbia and in bringing the province into Confederation in 1871.
 The province of Newfoundland entered the Canadian Confederation in 1949 under the leadership of Joey Smallwood, who was then referred to as the "only living Father of Confederation".

See also

List of prime ministers of Canada
List of national founders
Persons of National Historic Significance
Anti-Confederation Party

References

Further reading
 Careless, J.M.C. "George Brown and Confederation," Manitoba Historical Society Transactions, Series 3, Number 26, 1969-70 online

External links

 Fathers of Confederation - Library and Archives Canada

 
Canadian Confederation
Pre-Confederation Canada
Post-Confederation Canada (1867–1914)